Mramorovo pri Lužarjih is a small settlement northeast of Nova Vas in the Municipality of Bloke in the Inner Carniola region of Slovenia. It no longer has any permanent residents.

References

External links

Mramorovo pri Lužarjih on Geopedia

Populated places in the Municipality of Bloke